Joseph North or Joe North may refer to:

Sportspeople
Joe North, English footballer
Joseph North (soccer) in 2006 PDL season

Others
Joseph North (actor) in Ladies Should Listen
Joe North, character in Adventures of a Taxi Driver
Joseph North (writer), see Alexander Trachtenberg

See also